Javier Eduardo Assad Ramírez (born July 30, 1997) is a Mexican professional baseball pitcher for the Chicago Cubs of Major League Baseball (MLB).

Career
Assad signed with the Chicago Cubs as an international free agent in 2015.

He made his MLB debut on August 23, 2022, against the St. Louis Cardinals.

References

External links

1997 births
Living people
Sportspeople from Tijuana
Major League Baseball players from Mexico
Major League Baseball pitchers
Chicago Cubs players
Arizona League Cubs players
Eugene Emeralds players
South Bend Cubs players
Myrtle Beach Pelicans players
Naranjeros de Hermosillo players
Tennessee Smokies players
Iowa Cubs players
2023 World Baseball Classic players